This is a list of Saint Helena, Ascension and Tristan da Cunha animals extinct in the Holocene that covers extinctions from the Holocene epoch, a geologic epoch that began about 11,650 years before present (about 9700 BCE) and continues to the present day.

Saint Helena, Ascension and Tristan da Cunha is a British Overseas Territory located in the South Atlantic. The territory consists of Saint Helena, Ascension Island, and the archipelago of Tristan da Cunha (including Gough Island), all of volcanic origin.

Numerous animal species have disappeared from Saint Helena, Ascension and Tristan da Cunha as part of the ongoing Holocene extinction, driven by human activity.

Birds (class Aves)

Pigeons and doves (order Columbiformes)

Pigeons and doves (family Columbidae)

Cuckoos (order Cuculiformes)

Cuckoos (family Cuculidae)

Rails and cranes (order Gruiformes)

Rails (family Rallidae)

Albatrosses and petrels (order Procellariiformes)

Petrels and shearwaters (family Procellariidae)

Pelicans, herons, and ibises (order Pelecaniformes)

Herons (family Ardeidae)

Hornbills and relatives (order Bucerotiformes)

Hoopoes (family Upupidae)

Insects (class Insecta)

Dragonflies and damselflies (order Odonata)

Skimmers, perchers, and relatives (family Libellulidae)

Earwigs (order Dermaptera)

Striped earwigs (order Labiduridae)

Beetles (order Coleoptera)

Ground beetles (family Carabidae)

Gastropods (class Gastropoda)

Order Stylommatophora

Family Achatinidae

Family Charopidae

Family Pupillidae

Whorl snails (family Vertiginidae)

Notes

References

Lists of extinct animals by region